Jeffrey Marc Talpins is the founder and Chief Investment Officer of New York-based hedge fund, Element Capital Management. He is a “macro” trader who uses options to try to capture the upside of — and limit potential losses from — strategies aimed at anticipating global economic shifts.The Wall Street Journal referred to Talpins as “the hedge fund king you’ve never heard of” and “the hottest investor on Wall Street."

Talpins founded the fund in 2005 at Proxima Alfa Investments USA LLC as Element Capital Group and then spun out into an independent firm in 2009. Element is one of the world’s largest hedge funds dedicated to macro investing with approximately $17.5 billion in assets under management and a 21% annualized return since inception, as of August 2018. By December 2018, the firm was described as a "heavyweight," managing $18.2 billion."

Biography

Education 
Talpins graduated from Yale University with a Bachelor of Science (Summa Cum Laude and Phi Beta Kappa) with Distinction in Economics and Applied Mathematics (focus in Finance).

Career 
Talpins worked in the Mortgage Backed Securities Department at Goldman Sachs, and later at Citigroup's Fixed Income Options as the Head Trader, credited with expanding this business. Talpins was recruited by Ravi Mehra and Robert Sleutz of Vega Asset Management under the Vega Plus Partners platform to set up his own fund where he launched Element Capital with Vega's seed capital and infrastructure. 

He launched Element Capital in 2005 with $250 million.

Industry achievements
Element Capital has been one of the best performing hedge funds of the past decade, having appeared on Barron’s Top 100 Hedge Funds list eight of the last ten years (2008-2017).

From late 2017 through early 2018, the firm made over $3 billion in profits betting that the passage of tax reform would lift global asset prices. In August 2018, the fund raised an additional $3 billion mostly from existing investors and closed to new capital.

Philanthropy 
Talpins is a member of the Board of Trustees of Harlem Children’s Zone (HCZ), which helps disadvantaged children and families living in Harlem. He also sits on the board of the American Prairie Foundation, which is dedicated to creating the largest nature reserve in the continental United States. In 2018 Talpins endowed a leadership post at Yale to help the university advance domestic policy research. “With our country facing so many critical long-term challenges, I believe the Tobin Center will put Yale’s research efforts right at the center of the public policy debate, leading to better outcomes for our society,” he said. Talpin supports Jewish organizations including the Larchmont Temple, the Jewish Federation of Northern New Jersey, the United Jewish Appeal Federation of New York, and the Atalef Foundation, the official association of the Israeli Naval Commandos Unit. In April 2021, the Jeffrey M. Talpins Foundation partnered with the Atlantic Council's Middle East Programs to launch the Abraham Dialogues, a project to improve relations between Israel and neighboring Arab countries. Lifting Up Westchester, a non-profit organization that helps people regain independence, honored Lead Developer at Element Capital Matt Darnall and his wife Kathleen Kiernan at a virtual gala held in April 2021.

Personal life
Talpins is married to Mara Marcus. They have 2 children, and live in New York with a second home in Montana.

References

Living people
American hedge fund managers
American Jews
American billionaires
Yale University alumni
Year of birth missing (living people)
Chief investment officers